This is a list of schools in Neath Port Talbot in Wales.

Primary schools

Alderman Davies CW Primary School
Alltwen Primary School
Baglan Primary School
Blaenbaglan Primary School
Blaendulais Primary School
Blaenhonddan Primary School
Bryn Primary School
Bryncoch CW Primary School
Brynhyfryd Primary School
Catwg Primary School
Central Infant School
Central Junior School
Cillfriw Primary School
Coedffranc Primary School
Coed Hirwaun Primary School
Creunant Primary School
Crymlyn Primary School
Crynallt Primary School
Eastern Primary School
Gnoll Primary School
Groes Primary School
Llangiwg Primary School
Llansawel Primary School
Melin Infants School
Melin Junior School
Mynachlog Nedd Junior School
Neath Abbey Infants School
Rhos Primary School
Sandfields Primary School 
St Joseph's RC Junior School
St Joseph's RC Primary School
St Therese's Catholic Primary School
Tonmawr Primary School
Tonnau Primary School
Traethmelyn Primary School
Tywyn Primary School
Ysgol Gynradd Gymraeg Blaendulais
Ysgol Gynradd Gymraeg Castell Nedd
Ysgol Gynradd Gymraeg Cwmnedd
Ysgol Gynradd Gymraeg Pontardawe
Ysgol Gynradd Gymraeg Rhos Afan
Ynys Fach Primary School
Ynysmardey Primary School

Secondary schools
Cefn Saeson Comprehensive School
Dwr-y-Felin Comprehensive School 
Llangatwg Comprehensive School 
St Joseph's Catholic School and Sixth Form Centre 
Ysgol Bae Baglan
Ysgol Gymraeg Ystalyfera Bro Dur
Ysgol Cwm Brombil

Special schools
Cwmtawe School
Velindre Community School
Ysgol Hendre Residential School
Ysgol Maes Y Coed

Further education colleges
Neath Port Talbot College

Former schools
Central Comprehensive School 
Cwrt Sart Comprehensive School, closed 2016
Cymer Afan Comprehensive School, opened 1932, closed 2019
Dyffryn Comprehensive School,opened 1912, closed 2018
Glan Afan Comprehensive School, opened 1896, closed 2016
Rhydhir Secondary Modern School, opened 1952, closed 1973 (site was used by Dwr-y-Felin until 2012)
Sandfields Comprehensive School

 
Neath Port Talbot